Cephonodes tamsi is a moth of the family Sphingidae. It is known from the Seychelles.

It is very similar to Cephonodes trochilus, but distinguishable by the reddish rather than brownish upperside of the abdomen and the white centres to the abdominal segments below. The upperside of the head, thorax and wing bases are unicolorous green. The abdomen is uniformly reddish. The underside of the abdominal segments are medially white and laterally pale yellow, separated by black.

References

External links
 Forum Entomologi Italiani - pictures of Cephonodes tamsi

Cephonodes
Moths described in 1960
Fauna of Seychelles